Steppin' is the third studio album by the Pointer Sisters, released in 1975 on the ABC/Blue Thumb label.

History
Steppin, which was more R&B heavy than the sister quartet's previous albums, generated a number one R&B hit with its first single, "How Long (Betcha' Got a Chick on the Side)".  It also peaked at #20 on the Billboard Hot 100.  A second single, "Going Down Slowly", was moderately successful, peaking at #16 on the R&B chart and #61 on the Billboard Hot 100.  The album was remastered and issued on CD in 2006 by Hip-O Select.

Track listing

 Personnel The Pointer Sisters Anita Pointer, Ruth Pointer, Bonnie Pointer, June Pointer – vocalsMusicians'
 Tom Salisbury – acoustic piano
 Stevie Wonder – electric piano (track 2)
 Herbie Hancock – Hohner clavinet (track 4)
 Jim Rothermel – Hohner clavinet (track 6)
 Chris Michie – guitar
 Wah Wah Watson – guitar (tracks 1, 3, 4, 8)
 Eugene Santini – bass
 Paul Jackson – bass (track 4)
 Gaylord Birch – drums, percussion
 Bill Summers – percussion (track 4)

Production 
 David Rubinson & Friends, Inc. – producer
 Fred Catero – recording engineer
 Fred Catero, David Rubinson – re-mix engineers
 Jeremy Zatkin – recording engineer on "Chainey Do"
 George Horn, Phil Brown – mastering engineers
 Tom Salisbury – arrangements
 Allyn Ferguson – arrangements on "I Ain't Got Nothin' But the Blues"
 Ken Welch, Mitzie Welch – treatment on "I Ain't Got Nothin' But the Blues"

Charts

References

External links
 

1975 albums
The Pointer Sisters albums
Albums produced by Dave Rubinson
Albums recorded at Wally Heider Studios
Blue Thumb Records albums